Luna Rami Amin Al-Masri (born 9 March 1994) is a Jordanian footballer who plays as an attacking midfielder.

Club career
Al-Masri joined Safa in 2020; she scored one goal and made one assist in four games in the 2019–20 season.

Career statistics

International

References

External links 
 
 Luna Al-Masri at the Jordan Football Association

Living people
1994 births
Sportspeople from Amman
Jordanian women's footballers
Women's association football midfielders
Jordan women's international footballers
Lebanese Women's Football League players
Jordanian expatriate footballers
Expatriate women's footballers in Lebanon
Jordanian expatriate sportspeople in Lebanon
Safa WFC players
Jordan Women's Football League players